Gonsalves is an English-language variation of the Portuguese surname Goncalves, meaning 'son of Gonzalo'.

People named Gonsalves include:

Education 
 Timothy A. Gonsalves (born 1954), Indian academician and entrepreneur
 Mary Emily Gonsalves (1919-2017), Pakistani Catholic nun who won the Sitara-e-Imtiaz for her services to education

Entertainment 
 June Gonsalves (c.1927-2018), British radio broadcaster
 Steve Gonsalves, star on the television series Ghost Hunters Academy
 Tell Father Gonsalves (1953), short story by Indian O. V. Vijayan
 Kartiki Gonsalves (Born 1986), Oscar winning Tamil Filmaker

Music 
 Anthony Gonsalves (1927–2012), 1930s Indian music teacher/arranger
 Anthony Gonsalves, subject of 1977 Bollywood movie Amar Akbar Anthony 
 "My Name Is Anthony Gonsalves" (song) (1977), Bollywood song featured in Amar Akbar Anthony
 My Name Is Anthony Gonsalves (film) (2007), based on the song
 Paul Gonsalves (1920–1974), American jazz musician
 Virgil Gonsalves (1931–2008), American jazz saxophonist (West Coast)

Sports 
 Andrew Gonsalves (born 1978), Guyanese cricketer
 Billy Gonsalves (1908–1977), American soccer player
 Courtney Gonsalves (1950–2013), Guyanese cricketer
 Jermaine Gonsalves (born 1976), British basketball player
 Stephen Gonsalves (born 1994), baseball player
 Vic Gonsalves (1887–1922), Dutch soccer player

Other people
 Colin Gonsalves (born 1952), senior advocate of the Supreme Court of India
 Harold Gonsalves (1926–1945), United States marine and World War II Medal of Honor recipient
 Jacome Gonsalves (1676–1742), Goan missionary to Sri Lanka
 Ralph Gonsalves (born 1946), prime minister of Saint Vincent and the Grenadines
 Rob Gonsalves (1959-2017), Canadian painter
 Blaine M. Gonsalves, fictional name for the G.I. Joe character Knockdown from Battleforce 2000

See also
 Gonçalves, Portuguese variation of Gonsalves
 Gonzalez (disambiguation), Spanish equivalent of Gonçalves
 Gonsales, Portuguese variation of Gonzalez
 Gonzales (disambiguation), Spanish variation of Gonzalez
 Gonsalvus of Spain (1255-1313), Spanish Franciscan theologian/scholastic philosopher

Portuguese-language surnames
Patronymic surnames
Surnames from given names